Infopark Cherthala (Malayalam: ഇൻഫോപാർക്ക് ചേര്‍ത്തല) is an information technology park located in Pallipuram village, Cherthala taluk of Alappuzha district, Kerala, India. The project was inaugurated by Ex. Chief minister V. S. Achuthanandan.

Description
The park is built on the hub and spoke model for the development of the information technology industry in Kerala. The total area of the park is 66 acres of land and of which 60 acres has been notified as a sector-specific Special Economic Zone by the Ministry of Commerce, Government of India. InfoPark, Kochi acts as the hub to the spokes located at InfoPark Thrissur and Cherthala. Infopark is 6.8 kilometres (4.2 mi) from downtown Cherthala bus station and 8.9 kilometres (5.5 mi) from the Cherthala railway station.  A few companies are registered as training institutes. Currently, more than 20 companies working there.

Companies
 Techgentsia Software Technologies Pvt. Ltd
 Voyager IT Solutions Pvt Ltd
 Pixotri Technologies
 Datum Innovation
 Ridgecone Technologies Pvt. Ltd
 Smarc Technologies
 Virtualsys Technologies
 Claysys
 Silver Link
 Qwave
 Calsys communication PVT LTD

See also
 InfoPark, Kochi
 Infopark Thrissur
 Technopark
 Technopark Kollam
 SmartCity, Kochi
 Technocity, Thiruvananthapuram

References

External links 
Official site

Software technology parks in Kerala
Government-owned companies of Kerala
Special Economic Zones of India